General Robert Cuninghame, 1st Baron Rossmore, PC (Ire) (18 April 1726 – 6 August 1801) was an Irish British Army officer and politician.

Military career
Cuninghame was the son of Colonel David Cuninghame and his wife Margaret Callander of Craigforth. He was a General in the Army who fought at an early age at the Battle of Culloden in 1746 with the 14th Foot. He later served as Commander-in-Chief of Ireland from 1793 to 1796.

Cuninghame sat as a Member of the Irish House of Commons for Tulsk from 1751 to 1761, for Armagh Borough from 1761 to 1768 and for Monaghan Borough from 1768 to 1796. Between 1788 and 1789 he represented East Grinstead in the British House of Commons.

Lord Rossmore later sat as an Irish Representative Peer in the House of Lords from January 1801 until his death in August 1801. He was childless and was succeeded in the barony according to the special remainder by his wife's nephew Warner William Westenra, 2nd Baron Rossmore. Lady Rossmore died in 1824. His residence was Mount Kennedy, near Newtownmountkennedy, County Wicklow. Here he died rather suddenly, aged seventy-five, in August 1801, having been in excellent health and good spirits to the end.

Sir Jonah Barrington (1756-1834), the judge and memoirist, was apparently the originator of the colourful story that Lord Rossmore's death was heralded by the wailing of a banshee.

Family lineage
Cuninghame was a descendant of the Cuninghames of Drumquhassle and married Elizabeth Murray, second daughter and co-heiress of Colonel John Murray, in 1754. Elizabeth brought him a large dowry, but the marriage, if not for love, is said to have been very happy. He was admitted to the Irish Privy Council in 1782 and in 1796 he was raised to the Peerage of Ireland as Baron Rossmore, of Monaghan in the County of Monaghan, with remainder to his wife's nephews Henry Alexander Jones (the son of Theophilus Jones and Anne Murray, eldest sister of Elizabeth; Henry Alexander Jones died childless before his uncle Lord Rossmore) and Warner William Westenra and Lieutenant-Colonel Henry Westenra, sons of Henry Westenra and Harriet Murray, youngest sister of Elizabeth.

Notes

References

External links 

|-

|-

1726 births
1801 deaths
5th Royal Irish Lancers officers
Barons in the Peerage of Ireland
Peers of Ireland created by George III
British Army generals
British Army personnel of the Jacobite rising of 1745
Commanders-in-Chief, Ireland
Irish MPs 1727–1760
Irish MPs 1761–1768
Irish MPs 1769–1776
Irish MPs 1776–1783
Irish MPs 1783–1790
Irish MPs 1790–1797
Members of the Irish House of Lords
Members of the Privy Council of Ireland
Northamptonshire Regiment officers
West Yorkshire Regiment officers
Irish representative peers
Members of the Parliament of Ireland (pre-1801) for County Monaghan constituencies
Members of the Parliament of Ireland (pre-1801) for County Armagh constituencies
Members of the Parliament of Ireland (pre-1801) for County Roscommon constituencies